USNS Gilliland (T-AKR-298) is a Gordon-class roll on roll off vehicle cargo ship of the United States Navy. She was originally built as a merchant vessel but later acquired and converted by the Navy, and assigned to the United States Department of Defense's Military Sealift Command. Gilliland was built in 1972 as MV Selandia. After some time spent in commercial service she was lengthened by Hyundai Heavy Industries in 1984, and later went on to be acquired by the US Navy under a long term charter. She was converted to a US Navy Vehicle Roll-on/Roll-off Ship at Newport News Shipbuilding and Drydock Company in Newport News, Virginia, in a contract dated 23 May 1997 and on completion was assigned to the Military Sealift Command under the name USNS Gilliland, after Medal of Honor recipient Corporal Charles L. Gilliland. Gilliland is one of 28 Strategic Sealift Ships operated by the Military Sealift Command. She is assigned to the MSC Atlantic surge force, and is maintained in Ready Operational Status 4.

In June 1996, a sudden windstorm caused Gilliland to break free from her mooring at Newport News, cross the harbor, and collide with the submarine  at her moorings and the destroyer , which was moored behind Tucson. While Deyo suffered the most damage, Tucson suffered only minor damage.

References

Gordon-class vehicle cargo ships
Auxiliary ships of the United States
1972 ships
Ships built by Hyundai Heavy Industries Group
Maritime incidents in 1996